Dendrobium triflorum is a species of orchid native to Asia.

Distribution
The orchid is endemic to the island of Java, in Indonesia.

Description

See also

References

triflorum
Orchids of Java
Endemic flora of Java
Epiphytic orchids
Taxa named by Carl Ludwig Blume